The Institute of Chartered Accountants in England and Wales (ICAEW) is a professional membership organisation that promotes, develops and supports chartered accountants and students around the world. As of July 2022, it has over 198,000 members and students in 147 countries. ICAEW was established by royal charter in 1880.

Overview
The institute is a member of the Consultative Committee of Accountancy Bodies (CCAB), formed in 1974 by the major accountancy professional bodies in the UK and Ireland.  The fragmented nature of the accountancy profession in the UK is in part due to the absence of any legal requirement for an accountant to be a member of one of the many Institutes, as the term accountant does not have legal protection.  However, a person must belong to ICAEW, ICAS or CAI to hold themselves out as a chartered accountant in the UK (although there are other chartered bodies of British qualified accountants whose members are likewise authorised to conduct restricted work such as auditing).

The institute is also a founder member of Chartered Accountants Worldwide (CAW), an international network of accountancy bodies which represents over 1.8 million members and students in more than 190 countries.

ICAEW has two offices in the United Kingdom; at their headquarters, Chartered Accountants' Hall in Moorgate, London and in Central Milton Keynes at the Hub:MK complex. It also has offices in Belgium (Europe Region), China (Greater China Region), Hong Kong, Indonesia, Vietnam, Malaysia, Singapore and the United Arab Emirates (Middle East, Africa and South East Asia Region).

History
Until the mid-nineteenth century, the role of accountants in England and Wales was restricted to that of bookkeepers, in that accountants merely maintained records of what other business people had purchased and sold.  However, with the growth of the limited liability company and large scale manufacturing and logistic in Victorian Britain, a demand was created for more technically proficient accountants to deal with the increasing complexity of accounting transactions dealing with depreciation of assets, inventory valuation and the Companies legislation being introduced.

To improve their status and combat criticism of low standards, accountants in the cities of Britain formed professional bodies. ICAEW was formed from the five of these associations that existed in England prior to its establishment by royal charter in May 1880.

 The Incorporated Society of Liverpool Accountants, formed in January 1870;
 The Institute of Accountants in London was formed in November 1870, comprising 37 members under the leadership of William Quilter.  In 1871, standards for membership were established with new members having to show knowledge and aptitude through successfully passing an oral examination. Initially the London Institute restricted its membership to that city, but as other institutes were established elsewhere (for example, in Manchester and Sheffield) it was decided to remove this restriction and as such in 1872 it simply became known as the Institute of Accountants to reflect its new national coverage;
 The Manchester Institute of Accountants, formed in February 1871;
 The Society of Accountants in England (1872);
 The Sheffield Institute of Accountants (1877).

In 1920, following the Sex Disqualification (Removal) Act 1919, the organisation admitted Mary Harris Smith, who became the first woman chartered accountant in the world.

The headquarters of the institute, Chartered Accountants' Hall, in the City of London, which was designed in the Italian Renaissance style by John Belcher and built by Colls & Sons, was completed in 1892. It is widely regarded as one of the finest examples of Victorian Baroque architecture. Sir William Whitfield designed the 1964–70 extension and new entrance.

In 1948, the institute received a Supplemental Charter. In 1957, ICAEW merged with the Society of Incorporated Accountants (founded in 1885 as the Society of Incorporated Accountants and Auditors).

In 2019, as part of their celebration of 100 years of women being able to work as Chartered Accountants, ICAEW published a booklet on 100 years of women in Chartered Accountancy and launched a campaign to collect the stories of women members in chartered accountancy. In 2020, ICAEW announced the commissioning of a blue plaque in honour their first female member Mary Harris Smith.

Membership and qualifications
In order to become an ICAEW Chartered Accountant, it is necessary to achieve the ACA qualification.

ACA qualification
The ACA comprises four core elements that must be successfully completed. These are; professional development; ethics and professional scepticism; accountancy, finance and business modules; and practical work experience.

Professional development prepares students to successfully handle a variety of different situations they encounter throughout their career, improving their ability and performance in areas such as communication, decision-making, problem-solving and technical competence.

Ethics is embedded throughout the ACA qualification, developing students’ ethical capabilities to make suitable decisions, This is through an online programme based on the ICAEW Code of Ethics, the integration of ethical issues into all ACA exams and the practical application of ethical skills and behaviours within students’ work experience.

Practical work experience is undertaken as part of a training agreement with an authorised training employer or principal. Students must complete 450 days, which normally takes between three and five years. Experience can be completed in at least one of six categories: accounting; audit and assurance; financial management; information technology; insolvency; taxation.

ACA exams
There are 15 exams which are all computer based, spread across the Certificate level, the Professional level, and the Advanced level. Certificate level exams can be sat throughout the year at either dedicated test centres or at the candidate's own location via remote invigilation. Results of the Certificate level exams are provided to candidates within 24 hours of sitting the exams. The Professional and Advanced level exams are long-form scenario and case based exams, consisting of 2.5-4 hour examinations. Results of Professional and Advanced level exams are provided to candidates some several weeks after sitting the exams, and are published online, although candidates can choose to remain anonymous and have their name excluded from publishing. All of the Certificate level exams are closed book.
The Professional level exams are a mixture of fully open book, fully closed book, or permitting approved texts (such as IFRS publications or tax tables). All of the Advanced level exams are fully open book, with two of the exams having advanced information

ACA exam prizes
ICAEW awards prizes to high-scoring candidates in the ACA exams, including the Certificate level. There are subject-specific prizes for the best performance in a particular exam, and annual prizes for the highest marks across all the exams for a particular level. The subject-specific prizes can be awarded multiple times per year, reflecting the multiple sittings of exams each year; for the Professional level, there are 3-4 sittings per year for each exam, whilst for the Advanced level, there are 2 sittings per year for each exam. Prizes can be awarded jointly to multiple candidates.

Other ways to membership and affiliations

Some members of professional accountancy bodies within the European Union are eligible to apply for ICAEW membership under either the Statutory Audit Directive or the Recognition of Professional Qualifications (RPQ) Directive.

In 2010, ICAEW introduced its "Pathways to Membership" programme, which allows fully qualified members from certain professional bodies to apply for membership based on their experience.

There are also various other routes to membership, including reciprocal arrangements, advanced credit arrangements and common content arrangements with other professional accountancy bodies around the world.

Membership categories 
Members have the designation ACA (Associate Chartered Accountant) or FCA (Fellow Chartered Accountant) after their name.

Fellowship is intended to designate those who have achieved a higher level of professional experience. It is awarded on application, and at no additional cost, to those members who have attained at least ten years of membership and who, at the date of application, have complied with the institute's requirements on continuing professional development in the preceding three years and have no outstanding disciplinary charges against them.

Regulation and discipline 
As an improvement regulator, ICAEW works to protect the public by making sure ICAEW Chartered Accountants, firms that are regulated by ICAEW and students studying with ICAEW maintain the highest standards of professional competency and conduct. An improvement regulator works to educate as well as monitor the quality of its firms and members’ work and enforce change (change can include restrictions, penalties, exclusion from membership or from working in a regulated area) when needed. To ensure impartiality, the regulatory and disciplinary roles of ICAEW are carried out by a separate department, the Professional Standards Department. All of this work is overseen by several layers of independent governance; an independent board, the (IRB) and regulatory and disciplinary committees (at least half of each board must be lay members (non-accountants)) and oversight bodies including the Financial Reporting Council and the Insolvency Service.

Faculties
ICAEW has seven faculties, each run by an in-house team working together with members who are experts in their particular sector:

 Audit and Assurance
 Business and Management
 Corporate Finance
 Financial Reporting
 Financial Services
 Tax
 Tech

The Tax Faculty was the first to be formed in 1990; The monthly TAXline publication started in 1991, and an annual Technical
Review (now Tax Planning) was first published in October 1992. The Tax Faculty joined the Confédération Fiscale Européenne (CFE) in 2001.

District societies
The institute has 25 district societies across the UK, the largest of which is the London Society of Chartered Accountants (LSCA) with over 38,000 members. The LSCA was instrumental in the formation of the influential Hundred Group of finance directors.

See also
 British qualified accountants

References

External links
 ICAEW official website
 Key Facts and Trends in the UK Accountancy Profession, annual publication by the Professional Oversight Board
 Fraud Advisory Panel charity, founder and funding member
 ICAEW as Improvement Regulator
 ICAEW Regulatory Board
 Regulatory and Disciplinary committees

1880 establishments in England
Accounting in the United Kingdom
Business organisations based in London
Finance in England
Organisations based in the City of London
Organizations established in 1880
Milton Keynes
Chartered Accountants
Member bodies of the International Federation of Accountants
Legal regulators of the United Kingdom